The 1909–10 Ottawa Hockey Club season saw the Ottawa Hockey Club secede from the Eastern Canada Hockey Association (ECHA), and join the new Canadian Hockey Association (CHA), only to abandon that group and join the National Hockey Association (NHA) a few weeks later. Ottawa held on to its Stanley Cup championship status through several challenges, only to lose it to the Montreal Wanderers who won the NHA championship.

Team business
The CHA was formed by three teams from the Eastern Canada Hockey Association: Ottawa, Quebec, and the Montreal Shamrocks. They wanted to form a new league after the Montreal Wanderers of the ECHA were sold to new owners that wanted to move the club to the smaller Jubilee Arena. The CHA rejected applications from Wanderers and other teams who then formed their own league, the National Hockey Association (NHA). The backers of the NHA included some very successful businessmen who had much deeper pockets than the CHA owners.

With the two competing leagues, competition for players was fierce. Renfrew wanted to get as many players from Ottawa as it could. While not signing Fred Lake, Dubby Kerr or Marty Walsh, Renfrew was able to sign Cyclone Taylor immediately before the season started. The club threatened Taylor with legal action after he accepted a $50 check from them, but then signed with Renfrew. Edgar Dey left to play with Haileybury.

The CHA folded on January 15, 1910, after only a handful of games were played. Ottawa and the Shamrocks of the CHA were immediately absorbed into the NHA.

As Stanley Cup champions, the Ottawas attempted to arrange three Stanley Cup challenge series which had been accepted by the Stanley Cup trustees. Series with Edmonton and Galt, Ontario, were arranged, but a planned challenge with the Winnipeg Shamrocks was abandoned when Winnipeg wired that they could not keep their team intact. The Ottawas won both the Galt and Edmonton series. Ottawa is considered co-champions of the Stanley Cup in 1910.

Results
CHA
Play started on December 30. After a few games it was clear that fan interest
was not there as only 800 fans were recorded for the game between the Nationals
and the Shamrocks.

NHA
A meeting with the NHA on January 15, 1910, was planned to consider amalgamation with the CHA, but amalgamation was not discussed. Instead the NHA admitted Ottawa and the Shamrocks. The Le National were offered the franchise of Les Canadiens, but declined. No invitation was offered to All-Montreal and Quebec. The CHA ceased operations.

Final standings

Results

Player statistics

Goaltending averages

Scoring leaders

Stanley Cup Challenges

During the CHA season, Ottawa as Cup champion played one challenge in addition to their regular schedule:

Ottawa vs. Galt

Ottawa played a two-game total goals series against Galt, Ontario, champions of the Ontario Professional Hockey League and prevailed with 12–3 and 3–1 victories. Marty Walsh led Ottawa with 6 goals.

Ottawa vs. Edmonton

During the NHA season Ottawa as Cup champion played a challenge against Edmonton in addition to their regular schedule. Edmonton was champion of the Alberta Amateur Hockey Association.

See also
 1910 NHA season
 List of Stanley Cup champions

References

Notes

Ottawa
Ottawa Senators (original) seasons
Stanley Cup championship seasons
1910 NHA season